Agios Epifanios is a village in the Nicosia District of Cyprus, located 3 km west of Linou. Prior to 1974, the village was inhabited primarily by Turkish Cypriots.  Today the village is very insignificantly populated.

References

Communities in Nicosia District
Turkish Cypriot villages depopulated after the 1974 Turkish invasion of Cyprus